Wrotham Heath  is a settlement in the borough of Tonbridge and Malling in Kent, England. It is located on the A20 road, close to the junction between the M20 and M26 motorways. Wrotham Heath Golf Club was founded in 1906.

External links

 Wrotham Heath Golf Club

Villages in Kent